Gustavo Jorge Campagnuolo (born June 27, 1973) is an Argentine former football goalkeeper who played mostly for Racing Club.

Career

Born in Buenos Aires, Campagnuolo started his playing career in 1994 for Deportivo Español. During the 1997-98 season he played for Valencia of Spain but returned to Argentina after only making 2 league appearances for the club. His spell at Valencia was unsuccessful, and he is remembered for being the team's goalkeeper in a 6-0 defeat to Salamanca at El Helmántico.

Between 1998 and 2001, Campagnuolo played for San Lorenzo where he was part of the team that won the Clausura 2001 tournament. After this success he joined Racing Club where he was part of the team that won the Apertura 2001, which was the first league title for Racing in 35 years.

Between 2003 and 2005 he played in Mexico for Tigres before returning to Racing Club. In 2009, he returned to San Lorenzo de Almagro, where he played until his retirement in 2010.

Coaching career
After retiring at the end of the 2009-10 season, Campagnuolo started working as a goalkeeper coach for Banfield. In 2012 he returned to his former club San Lorenzo, still as a goalkeeper coach. In 2016 he worked under manager Edgardo Bauza for the Argentina national football team as goalkeeper coach until April 2017 where Bauza was sacked. He then moved to Huracán where he served for a few months. 

Ahead of the 2019-20 season, he returned to San Lorenzo as a goalkeeper coach under the staff of Juan Antonio Pizzi. Pizzi and his staff, including Campagnuolo, was fired on 31 October 2019.

On 17 April 2020, Campagnuolo was appointed goalkeeper coach of Vélez Sarsfield under manager Mauricio Pellegrino. Pellegrino and his staff, including Campagnuolo, was fired in March 2022.

Honours

References

External links
 Argentine Primera statistics

1973 births
Living people
Footballers from Buenos Aires
Argentine footballers
Argentine people of Italian descent
Association football goalkeepers
Argentine Primera División players
Deportivo Español footballers
San Lorenzo de Almagro footballers
Racing Club de Avellaneda footballers
Valencia CF players
Tigres UANL footballers
Argentine expatriate footballers
Expatriate footballers in Spain
Expatriate footballers in Mexico
Argentine expatriate sportspeople in Mexico
Argentine expatriate sportspeople in Spain